The R579 road is a regional road in Ireland. It travels from the R515 road at Broadford, County Limerick to the R618 on the outskirts of Cork, via the town of Kanturk and the villages of Banteer and Cloghroe. North of Kanturk, the road mostly follows the course of the River Allow.

References

Regional roads in the Republic of Ireland
Roads in County Limerick
Roads in County Cork